The discography of American singer-songwriter Bobbie Gentry consists of seven studio albums, one live album, one soundtrack album and thirty compilation albums. Gentry also released a total of thirty-one singles and fifteen extended plays.

Gentry rose to international fame with her intriguing Southern Gothic narrative "Ode to Billie Joe" in 1967. The track spent four weeks as the No. 1 pop song on the Billboard Hot 100 chart and was fourth in the Billboard year-end chart of 1967 and earned her Grammy awards for Best New Artist and Best Female Pop Vocal Performance in 1968. The album's second single, "I Saw an Angel Die", did not chart. 

Following the success of her debut single and album, Gentry's second studio album, The Delta Sweete, was released in February 1968. It did not reach the same level of commercial success as her first album. The two US singles, "Okolona River Bottom Band" and "Louisiana Man", peaked at No. 54 and No. 100, respectively, on the Billboard Hot 100. "Big Boss Man" was released as a single in France and did not chart.

Local Gentry, her third studio album, was released a short six months later in August 1968. Two singles were released from this album, "Sweete Peony" and "The Fool on the Hill", neither of which charted.

In September 1968, Gentry was paired with Glen Campbell and the duo released a collaboration album, Bobbie Gentry and Glen Campbell. The album spawned two singles, "Mornin' Glory" and "Let It Be Me".

Gentry's fifth studio album Touch 'Em with Love was released in July 1969. "Touch 'Em with Love" was released as the first single and "I'll Never Fall in Love Again" was released as the second single in Europe.

Fancy, Gentry's sixth studio album, was released in April 1970. The album's first single, "Fancy", peaked at No. 31 on the Billboard Hot 100 and No. 26 on the Top Country Songs chart. There additional singles were released from the album, "Raindrops Keep Fallin' on My Head", "He Made a Woman Out of Me", and "If You Gotta Make a Fool Out of Somebody".

In April 1971, Gentry released her seventh studio album, Patchwork, which would become her final album. Two singles were released from the album, "But I Can't Get Back" and "Somebody Like Me".

Albums

Studio albums

Live albums

Soundtrack albums

Compilation albums

Extended plays

Singles

As lead artist

Charted B-sides

Promotional singles

Notes

References 

Bobbie Gentry albums
Bobbie Gentry songs
Gentry, Bobbie